The 1993–94 WHL season was the 28th season for the Western Hockey League.  Sixteen teams completed a 72-game season.  The Kamloops Blazers won the President's Cup, before going on to win the Memorial Cup.

Regular season

Final standings

Scoring leaders
Note: GP = Games played; G = Goals; A = Assists; Pts = Points; PIM = Penalties in minutes

1994 WHL Playoffs

All-Star game

On February 1, a combined WHL/OHL All-Star team defeated the QMJHL All-Stars 9–7 at Moncton, New Brunswick before a crowd of 6,380.

WHL awards

All-Star Teams

See also
1994 Memorial Cup
1994 NHL Entry Draft
1993 in sports
1994 in sports

References
whl.ca
 2005–06 WHL Guide

Western Hockey League seasons
WHL
WHL